Charles R. Harding (aka ‘Wag’ Harding) (1/7/1867 - 1944) was an English professional single sculler who became the Champion of England and was a contender for the World Sculling Championship. He was born in London in 1867 and his occupation was that of a waterman. He made a name for himself in 1883, when he, at 16 years old, won the Chelsea Coat and Badge, and a year later, the Putney Coat and Badge. He was reported in the mid-1890s that “he pulls a beautiful even stroke, gets well over his sculls, while his leg-work is greatly admired.”

Harding trained the New Zealander Tom Sullivan when Sullivan had challenged George Bubear for the English Sculling Championship, which Sullivan won in September 1893. Thereafter, Harding himself challenged Sullivan for the English championship title. They sculled for the title on the Tyne River in February 1895, and Sullivan lost to his trainer. 
In September 1895 they had a re-match on the Championship Course on the Thames and again Harding won. His time was 22 minutes 59 seconds.
In July 1896, Harding challenged the Australian Jim Stanbury for the World Sculling Championship Title. The race again took place on the Thames but Stanbury defended his title and won the wager of £500 a side. At stake was the English Title as well.

He also competed for the Searle Memorial Cup (created in memory of Australian champion Henry Ernest Searle, who died of typhoid contracted on his journey home after competing in England. "Wag" Harding won it 3 times running, which meant he got to keep it.  It is now on display at The River & Rowing Museum, Henley, as part of the extensive Harding collection, currently on loan from his descendants.

References
The Evening Post Newspaper. 11 September 1895, 14 July 1896.

English male rowers
1860s births
Rowers from Greater London
Year of death missing